"All the Time" is a song by the DJ duo Playmen, featuring Greek-Swedish singer Helena Paparizou, the rapper Riskykidd and Courtney who has collaborated with Helena in vocals since 2009. The song was performed  for the first time at Mad VMA 2012 on June 20. The song contains a sample from Eddie Murphy's hit song, "Party All the Time".

Release and promotion
On 2 July 2012, the song had a digital release and, in the beginning of 2013, was released as part of the compilation CD The Anthem Vol. 2 by Panik Records.

Music video
A music video was filmed by director Apollonas Papatheoharis on 14 July 2012. Paparizou uploaded a backstage photo on her Twitter account the same day. The music video was uploaded to Playmen's official YouTube channel on 26 July 2012.

Track listing
Digital download
"All The Time" – 4:16

Digital download
"All The Time" – 4:16

Charts

Release history

References

2012 songs
2012 singles
Helena Paparizou songs
English-language Swedish songs
Songs written by Rick James